The following is a list of United States military aerial refueling aircraft

Active 
 HC-130
 KC-10
 KC-130
 KC-130J
 KC-135
 F/A-18E/F
 KC-46

Planned 
 MQ-25

Retired 
 KA-3
 KA-6D
 KB-29
 KB-50
 KC-97
 S-3

Cancelled 

 KC-45

United States military aircraft